Mamdouh Mohammed Hassan Elssbiay (born 16 September 1984), also known as Big Ramy, is an Egyptian IFBB professional bodybuilder. He is a two time Mr. Olympia champion, winning in 2020 and 2021.

Early life
Mamdouh Mohammed Hassan Elssbiay was born on 16 September 1984 in Al-Sebea, a town in Kafr El Sheikh. He worked as a fisherman before moving to Kuwait, where he started to train professionally in Kuwait City in 2009.

Bodybuilding career
Elssbiay earned his pro card by winning the overall title at the 2012 Amateur Olympia in Kuwait City. In 2010, he joined Oxygen Gym in Kuwait. By 2011, he weighed 200 lbs, and when he stepped on the 2012 Amateur Olympia Kuwait stage, he weighed in at 286 lbs and was declared the champion. In 2013, Elssbiay made his IFBB Pro-debut at the New York Pro, which he won. In 2020 and 2021, he won the Mr. Olympia contest.

Personal life
In October 2020, Elssbiay tested positive for COVID-19, preventing him from participating in the 2020 Europa Pro Bodybuilding Championships.

Elssbiay is a Muslim. In November 2021, it was revealed that he had secretly married his second wife, and that his first wife had discovered this through the media.

Competitive history 
Amateur
2012 Kuwait Golden Cup – 1st
2012 Amateur Olympia Kuwait – 1st (Earned Pro Card)
Professional
2013 New York Pro Championship – 1st
2013 Mr. Olympia – 8th
2014 New York Pro Championship – 1st
2014 Mr. Olympia – 7th
2015 Arnold Classic Brazil – 1st
2015 Mr. Olympia – 5th
2015 Arnold Classic Europe - 4th
2015 EVLS Prague Pro – 2nd
2016 Mr. Olympia – 4th
2016 Arnold Classic Europe – 2nd
2016 IFBB Kuwait Pro – 1st
2016 EVLS Prague Pro – 2nd
2017 Mr. Olympia – 2nd
2017 Arnold Classic Europe – 1st
2018 Mr. Olympia – 6th
2020 Arnold Classic – 3rd
2020 Mr. Olympia – 1st
2021 Mr. Olympia – 1st
2022 Mr. Olympia – 5th

References

External links 
 

1984 births
Living people
Egyptian bodybuilders
Egyptian expatriates in Kuwait
People from Kafr El Sheikh Governorate